The  is a class of electric multiple unit (EMU) commuter trains operated since 1997 by the privately owned Keihan Electric Railway on its Keihan Keishin Line and the Kyoto Municipal Subway Tozai Line in Japan.

Interior
Passenger accommodation consists of longitudinal bench seating in the intermediate cars and transverse seating in the end cars.

Formations
, the fleet consisted of eight four-car sets (801 to 815), formed with car 1 at the  end. All cars are motored.

The M1 and M2 cars each have one single-arm pantograph.

History
The first trains entered service in 1997.

Future developments
Between 2017 and March 2021, the entire fleet of 800 series trains is scheduled to be repainted in the standard corporate Keihan Electric Railway livery of "rest green" on the upper body and "atmos white" on the lower body separated by a "fresh green" stripe.

References

External links

  

Electric multiple units of Japan
800 series
Train-related introductions in 1997
Kawasaki multiple units
1500 V DC multiple units of Japan